Meulen is a Dutch toponymic surname meaning "mill" (modern Dutch molen). Notable people with the surname include:

Ever Meulen (born 1946), pseudonym of Eddy Vermeulen, Belgian illustrator
Henry Meulen (1882–1978), British anarchist and economist
Manoe Meulen (born 1978), Dutch women's footballer

See also
Van der Meulen
Vermeulen

References

Dutch-language surnames
Toponymic surnames